Er with caron (Р̌ р̌; italics: Р̌ р̌) is a letter of the Cyrillic script.

Er with caron is used in the Nivkh language, where it represents the voiceless alveolar trill .

See also
Ř ř : Latin letter R with caron - a Czech, Silesian, and Sorbian letter
Ҏ ҏ : Cyrillic letter Er with tick
Ԗ ԗ : Cyrillic letter Rha
Cyrillic characters in Unicode

Cyrillic letters with diacritics
Letters with caron